Hannes Daube (born 5 January 2000) is an American water polo player. He competed in the 2020 Summer Olympics.

Daube was born in the United States to a German mother and New Zealand father. He played college water polo at the University of Southern California.

References

External links
 USC Trojans bio

2000 births
Living people
Sportspeople from Newport Beach, California
Olympiacos Water Polo Club players
Water polo players at the 2020 Summer Olympics
American male water polo players
Olympic water polo players of the United States
American people of German descent
American people of New Zealand descent
USC Trojans men's water polo players
Pan American Games medalists in water polo
Pan American Games gold medalists for the United States
Water polo players at the 2019 Pan American Games
Medalists at the 2019 Pan American Games